Virginia L. Stone (born May 3, 1921 – March 12, 1997) was an American film editor, producer and director. She is known for her collaborations with her husband, filmmaker Andrew L. Stone.

Filmography as director 
Run If You Can (1987)
Money to Burn (1983)
The Treasure of Jamaica Reef (aka Evil in the Deep) (1975)

External links 

1921 births
1997 deaths
American film directors
American film producers
American women film directors
20th-century American businesspeople
American women film producers
American women film editors
American film editors
20th-century American businesswomen